Vitaly Portnikov (born 1967) is a Ukrainian editor and journalist.

Biography
Portnikov was born in 1967 in Kyiv, Ukrainian SSR, Soviet Union (modern-day Ukraine). He graduated from the MSU Faculty of Journalism in 1990. During his studies, he cooperated with the Kyiv newspaper Molod Ukrayiny.

Since 1989, he works as the analyst of the Nezavisimaya Gazeta, specializing in post-Soviet countries, and cooperates with the Russian and Ukrainian services of Radio Free Europe/Radio Liberty.

As a free-lance journalist he has been publishing articles in Russian newspapers Russkiy Telegraf, Kommersant, Vedomosti, Vremya MN, Vremya Novostei, Moskovskiye Novosti, Obschaya gazeta, Ukrainian The Day, Korrespondent, Profil, Delovaya Nedelya, Dzerkalo Tyzhnia, Kontrakty, Novynar, Glavred, Latvian Biznes & Baltia, Telegraf, Estonian Estonia, Postimees, Polish Polityka, Gazeta Wyborcza, Polska, Belarusian BelGazeta. In 2007, he was the editor-in-chief of the Media-Dom holding & the Ukrainian newspaper Gazeta24. Since 2008, he has been the author of the weekly TV show "Kyivski pohliad". 
His areas of interest are also Jews and the Middle East. He is the columnist of the Israel's most-popular Russian-language newspaper Vesti and Moscow-based Evreiskie novosti.

In May 2010 Portnikov was appointed editor-in-chief of TVi. In November 2012 he became president of this channel.

In November 2013 Portnikov started creating programs for Espreso TV. 

In 2013 Portnikov was one of the organisers of the Euromaidan demonstrations. Late January 2014 he temporary lived in Warsaw (Poland) because he had received from his contacts in Russia strong evidence of a "provocation being prepared against him" to harm the Euromaidan movement. Prior to this happening, a video which had intimate and illegally obtained images of Portnikov was leaked on the internet. In July 2015 Portnikov became a member of the supervisory board Ukrainian National Council for TV and Radio Broadcasting as a representative of the political party People's Front.

Awards
Vitaly Portnikov is the winner of the 1989 "Zolote Pero" (Golden Pen) award of the Ukrainian Association of Journalists. He has also been nominated for the title of the Journalist of the Year in Ukraine.

References

External links
 Vitaly Portnikov personal official webpage

1967 births
Living people
Moscow State University alumni
Journalists from Kyiv
Ukrainian television journalists
Ukrainian Jews
People of the Euromaidan